FUTBOLIN (FUll Transfer By Optimized LINe-by-line methods) is a multi-level multiple scattering radiative transfer model for the calculation of line-by-line atmospheric emission/transmission spectra in planetary atmospheres. It has been developed by Javier Martín-Torres (AS&M. Inc, NASA/Langley Research Center, Hampton, VA, USA; Jet Propulsion Laboratory, Pasadena, CA; Now at IACT (CSIC-URG), Granada, SPAIN). It allows generating high-resolution synthetic spectra in the 0.3-1000 micrometre spectral range.

The code can handle spherical or plane-parallel atmospheres.  It reads spectral lines in HITRAN or GEISA format and can handle CO2 line mixing and continuum absorption from H2O, O2, N2 and CO2.  It also takes into account the Non Local Thermodynamic Equilibrium (NLTE) effects on the rotational, electronic and vibrational populations of the atmospheric species and allows to specify any combinations of clouds, coverage and spectral albedo. It has been used to model the Earth's atmosphere, and the atmospheres of Mars, Venus, and Titan.

The code can calculate reflection, transmission, absorption, infrared cooling rate, and flux spectra.

See also 
Radiative transfer

References 
 Martin-Torres, F. J., & Mlynczak, M. G., 2005, American Geophysical Union, Spring Meeting, abstract #A21A-05
 Kratz, D. P. et al., "An inter-comparison of far-infrared line-by-line radiative transfer models", Journal of Quantitative Spectroscopy & Radiative Transfer, v. 90, iss. 3–4, p. 323-341.
 Mlynczak et al., "Observations of the O(3P) fine structure line at 63 μm in the upper mesosphere and lower thermosphere", Journal of Geophysical Research, Volume 109, Issue A12, CiteID A12306

Scattering
Planetary atmospheres